Wade Shire, also known as Griffith Shire Council from 1981-1987, was a Municipal council in New South Wales, Australia. Centred around the town of Griffith, the council was abolished in 1987 with the creation of the City of Griffith.

Towns and villages 

 Griffith (Council seat)
 Beelbangera
 Bilbul
 Hanwood
 Lake Wyangan
 Nericon
 Tharbogang
 Widgelli
 Wilbriggie
 Yenda
 Yoogali

References 

Former local government areas of New South Wales
1987 disestablishments in Australia